Percy Ollivant Francis (9 January 1875–1947) was an English footballer who played in the Football League for Derby County.

References

1875 births
1947 deaths
English footballers
Association football forwards
English Football League players
Derby County F.C. players